River Lark Act 1698 c. 22 was an Act of Parliament to facilitate making the River Lark navigable from Bury St Edmunds to Mildenhall in Suffolk.

The act empowered Henry Ashley (junior) of Eaton Socon to improve the river to make it navigable from Long Common, through Mildenhall to East-gate Bridge in Bury St Edmunds.

References

Waterways in England